Lauriston railway station served the village of Bush, Aberdeenshire, Scotland from 1865 to 1966 on the Montrose and Bervie Railway.

History 
The station opened on 1 November 1865 by the Scottish North Eastern Railway.  The goods yard was at the east end of the station. The station closed to passengers on 1 October 1951 and closed to goods on 23 May 1966.

References

External links 

Disused railway stations in Aberdeenshire
Former North British Railway stations
Railway stations in Great Britain opened in 1865
Railway stations in Great Britain closed in 1951
1865 establishments in Scotland
1966 disestablishments in Scotland